USS Ozark may refer to:

 , the lead ship of her class of monitor, launched in 1863 and stricken in 1865.

United States Navy ship names